Isabelle Christine Lourenço Gomes Drummond (born 12 April 1994) is a Brazilian actress.

Career 
Debuted on TV with a novel rapid participation in Laços de Família in 2000.

The following year, she played the small Rosicler, the daughter of Ana Paula Arósio character in the miniseries Os Maias. In the same year, became the show's child Emília Sítio do Picapau Amarelo.

In 2007 she played Gina in the telenovela Eterna Magia and in 2008 made a contribution of two chapters in the novel A Favorita.

She appeared in the film Xuxa Popstar in 2000, and in 2009 she starred in the feature film Se Eu Fosse Você 2 playing the role of Bia, the daughter of the main couple, Tony Ramos and Gloria Pires, Cláudio and Helena respectively, girl pregnant early boyfriend who hid from his father.

In addition, she participated in several special year-end of the station and also starred in the special Rede Globo celebrating 40 years of the channel, A História de Rosa.

In 2009 and 2010 she played Bianca in Caras & Bocas, one of the main characters of the story. Her character exploded in the media and launched the slogans "É a Treva !", "Sou muito experiente", "Sou a rainha dos biscoitos de Polvilho", which fell to the popular taste.

In 2011 she was scheduled to join the cast of six novel Globo Cordel Encantado. Also in the year 2011 declared in an interview to the magazine who is evangelical.

In 2012 she starred alongside actresses Taís Araújo and Leandra Leal in the telenovela Cheias de Charme.

In 2013, she starred in the telenovela Sangue Bom of Maria Adelaide Amaral and Vincent Villari, where she played Giane, a hardcore Corinthians fan.

In 2014, she played her third main role, as Megan in Geração Brasil, repeating the partnership with the authors Filipe Miguez and Izabel de Oliveira.

Filmography

Television

Film

Singles

Personal life
Drummond is a practicing member of the Presbyterian church, although she sometimes attends Baptists with her mother and step-sister. Drummond's father, Fernando Luiz Drummond Xavier, was murdered in February 2007.

From 2014 to 2015 she briefly dated singer Tiago Iorc.

References

External links 

1994 births
Living people
People from Niterói
Brazilian people of Scottish descent
Brazilian child actresses
Brazilian television actresses
Brazilian film actresses
Brazilian telenovela actresses
Brazilian stage actresses
Isabelle
Brazilian Presbyterians